"Once a Day" is a song written by Bill Anderson and recorded as the debut single by American country artist Connie Smith. It was produced by Bob Ferguson for her self-titled debut album. The song was released in August 1964, topping the Billboard country music chart for eight weeks between late 1964 and early 1965. It was the first debut single by a female artist to reach number one on the Billboard Hot Country Songs. This song peaked at number one for the week of November 28, 1964, and it stayed at number one for eight consecutive weeks, a record for a female solo artist for nearly 50 years, until it was surpassed by Taylor Swift's "We Are Never Ever Getting Back Together" in December 2012.

In 2020, "Once a Day" was deemed "culturally, historically, or aesthetically significant" by the Library of Congress and selected for preservation in the National Recording Registry.

Background and content 
"Once a Day" was written by American country artist, Bill Anderson, especially for Connie Smith. Originally recorded by Smith as a demo, the song was officially recorded at her first session with RCA Victor Records on July 16, 1964 at Studio B in Nashville, Tennessee. Produced by Bob Ferguson, the session was accompanied by Nashville's "A-Team" of musicians, which included members of Anderson's touring band, The Po' Boys. The song itself describes a woman who has not gotten over her previous lover. Although the woman explains that she has limited her grieving to "once a day," it is later found out that she is grieving, "once a day, every day, all day long." 

While also singing lead vocals on "Once a Day," Smith was also featured playing the song's guitar accompaniment. The song was re-recorded by Smith in French and was re-titled, "Pas Souvent." That year the song was released as a single to France, and was released seven years later on Smith's compilation, Love Is the Look You're Looking for in 1973. It was re-recorded for a third time for her 1976 studio album, The Song We Fell in Love To on Columbia Records.

Cover versions 
Since the song's release, "Once a Day" has been recorded by over 50 different artists. Such artists as country artist Loretta Lynn recorded a cover of the song for her 1965 album, Songs from My Heart. The same year, David Houston recorded "Once a Day" for his studio album, Twelve Great Country Hits. In 1966, R&B vocalist, Timi Yuro released her version as single, which peaked at #67 on the Billboard Pop Chart. Chicano artist, Trini Lopez recorded the song in 1968 for his country album, Welcome to Trini Country. In November 1969, country artist, Lynn Anderson released an album of country cover versions entitled, Songs That Made Country Girls Famous, which included a version of "Once a Day." Dean Martin recorded a Traditional Pop version of the song, which was released on his 1970 album, My Woman, My Woman, My Wife.

In 1986, Australian Rock band, The Triffids recorded "Once a Day" for their album, In the Pines. Punk Rock artist, Mike Ness recorded a version for his 1999 solo album, Under the Influences. In 2005, Martina McBride's album of country classics, Timeless included a cover of the song. In 2006 Van Morrison included a cover on his Pay The Devil release. In 2015, Doyle Lawson, Paul Williams, and J.D. Crowe released a version on their compilation album, Still Standing Tall and Tough.

Chart performance 
"Once a Day" was released as Connie Smith's debut single under RCA Victor Records. It was rush-released as a single August 1, 1964, and moved quickly up the country music chart. The song became Smith's commercial breakthrough recording, reaching No. 1 on the Billboard Magazine Hot Country Songs chart the week of November 28, and remaining at the top spot for eight weeks until January 16, 1965. This longevity record stood unmatched until December 2012, when "We Are Never Ever Getting Back Together" by Taylor Swift overtook the achievement with nine weeks at No. 1. Despite this success, Smith never topped the Billboard country charts again, and this song became her solo No. 1. She did, however, top the country charts twice more in Canada, with her cover of Gordon Lightfoot's Ribbon of Darkness (1969) and The Everly Brothers' ('Til) I Kissed You (1976).

Smith previously held the record of being the only country female to reach No. 1 with a debut single. Trisha Yearwood equalled Smith's record in 1991 with, "She's in Love with the Boy." After it reached No. 1, "Once a Day" became one of the year's biggest songs and was nominated for Best Country Song from the Grammy Awards.

"Once a Day" made Smith a major star in country music, nominating her for a series of Grammy Awards, including Best Female Country Vocal Performance and Best New Country Artist. It was released on Smith's self-titled debut album in March 1965, which also reached No. 1. The single helped gain Smith a series of major hits under RCA Victor in the 1960s. Her follow-up single, "Then and Only Then" (released in 1965) reached No. 4 on the Billboard Country Chart, and a series of unbated Top 10 hits continued until mid-1968, including "If I Talk to Him," "Ain't Had No Lovin'," and "The Hurtin's All Over." Smith would continue on to have nineteen more top 10 singles during her career.

Charts

References

1964 songs
1964 debut singles
Songs written by Bill Anderson (singer)
Connie Smith songs
Trini Lopez songs
Loretta Lynn songs
Van Morrison songs
Jimmy Dean songs
Bobby Vinton songs
Glen Campbell songs
Connie Francis songs
Dean Martin songs
George Jones songs
Martina McBride songs
Kitty Wells songs
Don Gibson songs
Lynn Anderson songs
Hank Locklin songs
Timi Yuro songs
Song recordings produced by Bob Ferguson (musician)
RCA Records singles
Songs about heartache
United States National Recording Registry recordings